François Migault (4 December 1944 – 29 January 2012) was a racing driver from Le Mans, France. He participated in 16 Formula One World Championship Grands Prix, debuting on 13 August 1972, but scored no championship points.

Career
A native of Le Mans, he also entered the 24 Hours of Le Mans race 25 times, between 1972 and 2002.

In , he drove almost a complete season with British Racing Motors after both BRM drivers of 1973, Niki Lauda and Clay Regazzoni, had moved to Ferrari.

In , a few races with the ill-fated Embassy Hill team and Williams followed. In Formula Two that year, Migault achieved some success with an Osella FA2, scoring one point.

Migault continued to compete at Le Mans until he was in his mid-fifties and achieved a best finish of second in 1976, together with two other podium finishes.

Migault died on 29 January 2012 after a long battle with cancer.

Racing record

24 Hours of Le Mans results

Complete World Sportscar Championship results
(key) (Races in bold indicate pole position) (Races in italics indicate fastest lap)

Footnotes

Complete European Formula Two Championship results
(key)

Complete Formula One World Championship results
(key)

Non-Championship Formula One results
(key)

References

1944 births
2012 deaths
Sportspeople from Le Mans
French racing drivers
French Formula One drivers
European Formula Two Championship drivers
24 Hours of Le Mans drivers
Connew Formula One drivers
BRM Formula One drivers
Hill Formula One drivers
Williams Formula One drivers
World Sportscar Championship drivers
Kondō Racing drivers